Ti'inik, also transliterated Ti’innik, or Ta'anakh/Taanach, is a Palestinian village, located 13 km northwest of the city of Jenin in the northern West Bank. 

According to the Palestinian Central Bureau of Statistics, the village had a population of 1,095 inhabitants in mid-year 2006.

Antiquity

Tell Ta'annek/Tel Ta'anach: Bronze Age to Abbasid period

Just to the north of Ti'inik is a 40-metre-high mound which was the site of the biblical city of Taanach or Tanach, a Levitical city allocated to the Kohathites. Excavations at the tell were carried out by Albert Glock mostly during the 1970s and 1980s. Twelve Akkadian cuneiform tablets were found here. Approximately one third of the names on these tablets are of Hurrian origin, indicating a significant northern ethnic presence. Pottery remains from the Roman, Byzantine, and the Middle Ages have been found here. The main remains visible today are of an 11th-century Abbasid palace.

Ottoman period
Ti'inik, like the rest of Palestine, was incorporated into the Ottoman Empire in 1517, and in the census of 1596, the village appeared as "Ta'inniq", located in the nahiya of Sara in the liwa of Lajjun. It had a population of 13 households, all Muslim. They paid a taxes on agricultural products, including wheat, barley, summer crops, goats and beehives, in addition to occasional revenues; a total of 7,000 akçe.

In 1838, Ta'annuk was noted as a Muslim village in the Jenin district; It only contained a few families, but was said to have been much larger, and to contain ruins. 

In 1870 Victor Guérin found that the village consisted of ten houses. He further described it as: 'Once the southern sides and the whole upper plateau of the oblong hill on which the village stands were covered with buildings, as is proved by the innumerable fragments of pottery scattered on the soil, and the materials of every kind which are met with at every step: the larger stones have been carried away elsewhere. Below the village is a little mosque, which passes for an ancient Christian church. It lies, in fact, east and west, and all the stones with which it is built belong to early constructions; some of them are decorated with sculptures. Farther on in the plain are several cisterns cut in the rock, and a well, called Bir Tannuk.

In 1882 the PEF's Survey of Western Palestine (SWP) described it as "A small village, which stands on the south-east side of the great Tell or mound of the same name at the edge of the plain. It has olives on the south, and wells on the north, and is surrounded with cactus hedges. There is a white dome in the village. The rock on the sides of the Tell is quarried in places, the wells are ancient, and rock-cut tombs occur on the north near the foot of the mound."

British Mandate
In the 1922 census of Palestine, conducted by the British Mandate authorities, Ti'inik had a population of 65; all Muslims. In the 1931 census it had 64; still all Muslim, in a total of 15 houses.

In the 1945 statistics the population was 100; all Muslims, with 32,263 dunams of land, according to an official land and population survey. 452 dunams were used for plantations and irrigable land, 31,301 dunams for cereals, while a total of 4 dunams were built-up, urban land.

Jordanian period
In the wake of the 1948 Arab–Israeli War, and after the 1949 Armistice Agreements, Ti'inik came under Jordanian rule. 

The Jordanian census of 1961 found 246 inhabitants.

Post-1967
Since the Six-Day War in 1967, Ti'inik has been under Israeli occupation.

References

Bibliography

External links
The Archaeology of Ottoman Ti’innik
Welcome To Ti'innik
Survey of Western Palestine, Map 8: IAA, Wikimedia commons 

Villages in the West Bank
Jenin Governorate
Canaanite cities
Levitical cities
Archaeological sites in the West Bank
Municipalities of the State of Palestine